Sidharth Malhotra (born 16 January 1985) is an Indian actor who works in Hindi films. He began his career as a fashion model, but left it to pursue an acting career. He took on roles in television before assisting director Karan Johar on the 2010 film My Name Is Khan. He had his first lead role in Johar's teen film Student of the Year (2012).

Malhotra went on to star in such commercially successful films as the romantic comedy Hasee Toh Phasee (2014), the thriller Ek Villain (2014), and the drama Kapoor & Sons (2016). Following a career downturn, he gained praise for starring as Vikram Batra in the war film Shershaah (2021), earning a nomination for the Filmfare Award for Best Actor. He married his co-star in the film, Kiara Advani, in 2023.

Early life and family
Malhotra was born and raised in Delhi, India into a Punjabi Hindu family, to Sunil, a former captain in the Merchant Navy, and Rimma Malhotra, a homemaker. He was schooled at Delhi's Don Bosco School and Naval Public School, and graduated from Shaheed Bhagat Singh College, University of Delhi.
 At the age of 18, he began modelling. Although he was successful, he decided to quit after four years because he was dissatisfied with the profession.

Career

Debut and breakthrough (2012–2016)
Malhotra had his first acting role in 2009 in the television serial Dharti Ka Veer Yodha Prithviraj Chauhan, in which he played the small role of Jaichand. Interested in further pursuing an acting career, he successfully auditioned for a film to be directed by Anubhav Sinha. However, the film was shelved, following which he worked as an assistant director to Karan Johar on the 2010 film My Name Is Khan. In 2012, he made his film debut with Johar's teen drama Student of the Year alongside newcomers Varun Dhawan and Alia Bhatt. He was cast as Abhimanyu Singh, a scholarship student, who competes with his wealthy best friends to win an annual school championship. Film critic Rajeev Masand of CNN-IBN considered his performance to be "earnest", adding that he had "a pleasing presence." Student of the Year was a financial success, grossing  Worldwide.

Following a year-long absence from the screen, Malhotra starred opposite Parineeti Chopra in the 2014 romantic comedy Hasee Toh Phasee, which tells the love story of a scientist and an under-confident aspiring businessman. Saibal Chatterjee of NDTV praised his screen presence and compared it to the early work of Amitabh Bachchan. In the Mohit Suri-directed romantic thriller Ek Villain, he played Guru Divekar, a hardened criminal whose terminally-ill wife (played by Shraddha Kapoor) is murdered by a serial killer (played by Riteish Deshmukh). Shubhra Gupta of The Indian Express reviewed his performance as "watchable even if he has a hard time doing menace — he just seems so nice and wholesome all the time, even when he is crunching bones." The box office performance of the film established him as one of the most promising new actors of Hindi cinema.

Malhotra next appeared in a 2015 remake of the 2011 American film Warrior, titled Brothers, directed by Karan Malhotra and co-starring Akshay Kumar. The film received negative reviews and under-performed at the box office. Malhotra's next release, the Shakun Batra-directed family drama Kapoor & Sons, proved to be a critical and commercial success, grossing  1.53 billion worldwide. Featuring an ensemble cast including Fawad Khan, and Alia Bhatt, the film tells the story of two brothers of contrasting personalities (Malhotra and Khan) who return home to their dysfunctional family after their grandfather suffers from a cardiac arrest. A reviewer for India Today thought that Malhotra was overshadowed by Khan in the film, though Namrata Joshi of The Hindu wrote that "he holds his own with his solid presence and vulnerable glances".

Career fluctuations (2016–2020) 
Malhotra followed the success of Kapoor & Sons with a starring role in the romantic comedy Baar Baar Dekho alongside Katrina Kaif, playing a time-travelling mathematician. Directed by Nitya Mehra, the film was poorly received. Later in 2017, he starred in dual roles for the first time in the action comedy A Gentleman with Jacqueline Fernandez from the writer-director duo Raj Nidimoru and Krishna D.K., which was produced by Fox Star Studios; although highly anticipated, it opened to a poor reception. Both films were box-office bombs.

In a 2017 remake of the 1969 mystery film Ittefaq, Malhotra starred opposite Sonakshi Sinha. Released in 2017, the was positively received by critics,  but failed at the box office with a lifetime collection of  500 million. Neeraj Pandey's Aiyaary (2018) featured Malhotra along with Manoj Bajpayee and Rakul Preet Singh. The film opened on a note of  30 Million and collected  183.1 million. Bollywood Hungama, in a negative review said that "On the whole, Aiyaary misses the mark and is a huge letdown on the account of its flawed script and the lengthy run time" 

Malhotra's two releases of 2019 were poorly received and were deemed box office failures. He first starred in the romantic-comedy Jabariya Jodi, his second collaboration with Parineeti Chopra. The film had negative reviews and was considered a flop. His second appearance was in Milap Milan Zaveri's action film Marjaavaan, co-starring Ritesh Deshmukh and Tara Sutaria.

Shershaah and beyond (2021–present) 
In 2021, Malhotra had a lead role in the biographical war film Shershaah, based on the life of the Indian army officer Vikram Batra. After several delays due to the COVID-19 pandemic, the film premiered on Amazon Prime Video. It received mixed reviews from critics. Praise was directed at Malhotra's performance in particular, with Saibal Chatterjee writing that he "has what it takes to flesh out a real-life martyr who has left behind a larger-than-life aura". Shershaah was the most-watched film on Prime Video in India at the time of its release. 

Malhotra's sole film release of 2022 was the fantasy comedy Thank God, co-starring Ajay Devgn, which failed commercially. The following year, he played an Indian spy stationed in Pakistan before the Indo-Pakistani War of 1971 in the thriller Mission Majnu. Following several delays from its planned theatrical release, the film was ultimately released on Netflix. Monika Rawal Kukreja of Hindustan Times compared it unfavourably to Shershaah and stated that Malhotra was let down by the script despite being in "top form, with a charming onscreen presence". 

Malhotra will next star in the action film Yodha, and in Indian Police Force, a web series for Amazon Prime Video from director Rohit Shetty.

Other work 
In 2013, Malhotra collaborated with PETA for a campaign to spread awareness about dogs sterilisation. Later that year, he participated in a stage show in Hong Kong alongside Varun Dhawan and Alia Bhatt and performed at a charity event with Dhawan, Bhatt, Aditya Roy Kapur, Shraddha Kapoor and Huma Qureshi to raise funds for the flood-affected victims of Uttarakhand. In August 2016, he performed in various cities of America for the "Dream Team 2016" tour, alongside Karan Johar, the actors Dhawan, Bhatt, Roy Kapur, Katrina Kaif, Parineeti Chopra, and the singer Badshah.

Personal life 

In the late 2010s, Malhotra was rumoured to be dating actress Alia Bhatt. He confirmed the relationship in 2019, after they had broken up. Rumours of him dating actress Kiara Advani began in 2020, but he did not publicly speak about the relationship. On 7 February 2023, they married in Jaisalmer, Rajasthan in a traditional Hindu wedding ceremony. Their wedding received widespread media attention, resulting in their official wedding pictures being the most liked Instagram post in India till date.

In the media
 2014: Times of India's Most Desirable Men of 2013 #11
 2013: Times of India's Most Desirable Men of 2012 #12
2013: The Times of India Hotlist Most Promising Newcomer 2012 :#3
2013: The Times of India 50 Handsome Hunks in 100 years of Indian Cinema :#27

Filmography

Films

Television

Music videos

See also 

 List of Indian film actors

References

External links 

 

Punjabi Hindus
1985 births
Living people
21st-century Indian male actors
Indian male film actors
Indian male models
Male actors in Hindi cinema
Male actors from Delhi
Punjabi people
People from Delhi